The 2014 Kazakhstan Premier League was the 23rd season of the Kazakhstan Premier League, the highest football league competition in Kazakhstan. The season began on 15 March 2014 and was finished in November. Aktobe were the defending champions having won their fifth league championship the previous year.

Teams
FC Vostok and FC Akzhayik were relegated at the end of the 2013 season, and were replaced by FC Kaisar and Spartak Semey.

Team overview

Personnel and kits

Note: Flags indicate national team as has been defined under FIFA eligibility rules. Players and Managers may hold more than one non-FIFA nationality.

Managerial changes

Foreign players
The number of foreign players is restricted to seven per KPL team. A team can use only five foreign players on the field in each game.

In bold: Players that have been capped for their national team.

First round

League table

Results

Second round

Championship round

League table

Results

Relegation round

League table

Results

Relegation play-offs

Season statistics

Top scorers

Hat-tricks

Scoring
 First goal of the season: Maksim Azovskiy for Spartak Semey against Tobol (15 March 2014)
 Fastest goal of the season: 2nd minute, 
Edin Junuzović for Ordabasy against Aktobe (13 April 2014)
 Latest goal of the season: 94th minute, 
Damir Kojašević for Astana against Kaisar (29 March 2014)
Dmitri Miroshnichenko for Aktobe against Kaisar (19 April 2014)

References

Kazakhstan Premier League seasons
1
Kazakh
Kazakh